The Hungarian ambassador in Washington, D. C. is the official representative of the Government in Budapest to the Government of the United States.
Till 1920 he was listed as Austria-Hungary

List of representatives

References 

 
United States
Hungary